The U.S. state of Washington has 39 counties. The Provisional Government of Oregon established Vancouver and Lewis Counties in 1845 in unorganized Oregon Country, extending from the Columbia River north to 54°40′ north latitude. After the region was organized within the Oregon Territory with the current northern border of 49° north, Vancouver County was renamed Clark, and six more counties were created out of Lewis County before the organization of Washington Territory in 1853; 28 were formed during Washington's territorial period, two of which only existed briefly. The final five were established in the 22 years after Washington was admitted to the Union as the 42nd state in 1889.

Article XI of the Washington State Constitution addresses the organization of counties. New counties must have a population of at least 2,000 and no county can be reduced to a population below 4,000 due to partitioning to create a new county. To alter the area of a county, the state constitution requires a petition of the "majority of the voters" in that area. A number of county partition proposals in the 1990s interpreted this as a majority of people who voted, until a 1998 ruling by the Washington Supreme Court clarified that they would need a majority of registered voters. No changes to counties have been made since the formation of Pend Oreille County in 1911, except when the small area of Cliffdell was moved from Kittitas to Yakima County in 1970.

King County, home to the state's largest city, Seattle, holds almost 30 percent of Washington's population (2,269,675 residents of 7,705,281 in 2020), and has the highest population density, with more than 1,000 people per square mile. Garfield County is both the least populated (2,286) and least densely populated. Two counties, San Juan and Island, are composed only of islands.

Seventeen counties have Native American–derived names, including nine names of tribes whose land settlers would occupy. Another seventeen were named for political figures, only five of whom had lived in the region. The last five are named for geographic places.

The Federal Information Processing Standard (FIPS) code, used by the United States government to uniquely identify counties, is provided with each entry. The FIPS code links in the table point to U.S. Census data pages for each county. Washington's FIPS state code is 53.

Governance 

Counties provide a broad scope of services, including court operation, parks and recreation, libraries, arts, social services, elections, waste collection, roads and transportation, zoning and permitting, as well as taxation. The extent of these vary, and some are administered by municipalities. Counties are not subdivided into minor civil divisions like townships; sub-county local government is only by incorporated cities and towns, as well as by 29 Indian reservations, while unincorporated areas are governed only by the county. There are 242 census county divisions for statistical purposes only.

The default form of county government is the non-charter commission, with three to five elected commissioners serving as both the legislature and executive. Seven counties have adopted charters providing for home rule distinct from state law: King, Clallam, Whatcom, Snohomish, Pierce, San Juan, and Clark. Of these, King, Whatcom, Snohomish, and Pierce, four major counties on Puget Sound, elect a county executive. Councils in the other three charter counties appoint a manager to administer the government. Voters may also elect a clerk, treasurer, sheriff, assessor, coroner, auditor (or recorder), and prosecuting attorney. Elections are nonpartisan in non-charter counties, but charter counties may choose to make some positions partisan, though all elections are by top-two primary.

List of counties

|-
!scope="row"|Washington (state)|| 53 ||Olympia (state capital)||1853||Oregon Territory||George Washington (1732–1799), 1st U.S. President||7,705,281 ||||
|}

Former county names 
Four counties changed their name between 1849 and 1925.
 Chehalis County, originally named for the Chehalis people, was renamed Grays Harbor County in 1915.
 Sawamish County, originally named for the Sahewamish Native American tribe, was renamed Mason County in 1864.
 Slaughter County, originally named for Lieutenant William A. Slaughter who was killed during the Indian Wars, was renamed Kitsap County shortly after its formation in 1857. The initial proposals for this county called it Madison County or Kitsap County.
 Vancouver County, originally named for George Vancouver, was renamed Clarke County in 1849 and corrected to Clark in 1925.

Former counties 
During Washington's territorial period, Washington split off from an Oregon county, three counties were disestablished, and three split into separate territories.
Clackamas County, Oregon was established in 1844 and included the land south and east of the Columbia River until Washington Territory was formed in 1853, when the area was no longer organized as a county.
Spokane County was established in Washington Territory in 1858 until it merged into Stevens County in 1864; it was reestablished in 1879.
Missoula County was established in Washington Territory in 1860 until it split off with the Idaho Territory in 1863.
Shoshone County, Idaho County, and Nez Perce County were established in Washington Territory in 1861, and Boise County in 1863, until they split off into the Idaho Territory in March 1863, leaving the current borders of Washington.
 Ferguson County, named for Washington legislator James L. Ferguson, was established on January 23, 1863, from Walla Walla County and dissolved on January 18, 1865. Yakima County was established in its place.
 Quillehuyte County was split from Jefferson and Clallam counties in 1868 and returned to those counties a year later before it could be organized.

Proposed counties 
Several counties were proposed prior to or during the existence of Washington Territory and nine counties were proposed within the first 16 years of Washington's statehood, but none were established.
 The representatives at the Cowlitz Convention of 1851 discussed a proposal to form Columbia Territory, which included a number of new counties in what later became Washington. The next session of the Oregon Territorial Legislature created only one of these counties: Thurston County (which was originally proposed as Simmons County).
 Buchanan County was proposed in 1856 as a division of Clark County.
 Proposed counties during Washington's early statehood included Big Bend (1891), Palouse (1891 and 1903), Sherman (1891), Washington (1891), Wenatchee (1893), McKinley (1903), Steptoe (1903), and Coulee (1905).

 Since the 1990s, there have been several proposals for county secession in Washington, largely from rural areas in the major counties of Western Washington. Cedar, Freedom, and Skykomish counties submitted petitions to secede from King and Snohomish counties in 1995 and 1996, with some support in the state legislature to put them to a public referendum.

See also 

 List of United States counties and county equivalents
Government of Washington

References 

Works

External links
Washington State Association of Counties
Washington County Profiles – Municipal Research and Services Center of Washington
County officials – Washington Association of County Officials
National Association of Counties – Find A County

Washington, counties in
 List
Counties